Sobolevo is a rural locality (a village) in Yurochenskoye Rural Settlement, Sheksninsky District, Vologda Oblast, Russia. The population was 7 as of 2002.

Geography 
Sobolevo is located 21 km south of Sheksna (the district's administrative centre) by road. Maryino is the nearest rural locality.

References 

Rural localities in Sheksninsky District